Anathallis angustilabia is a species of plant in the Orchidaceae family.

Distribution 
It is endemic to Colombia.

Description 
Anathallis angustilabia is found in  forests at elevations of 800 to 2500 meters. It is an epiphyte that blooms in late winter to early spring.

Taxonomy 
It was named by Alec Melton Pridgeon, and Mark Wayne Chase in Lindleyana 16: 247 in 2001.

References 

Anathallis
Plants described in 2001
Flora of Colombia